Daniil Paroutis (born 2 January 2001) is a Cypriot professional footballer who plays for Cypriot club Anorthosis Famagusta.

Paroutis with a presence at the Anorthosis academies who was born in Limassol. In addition to Anorthosis, to which he returned in the Summer of 2020, he was also present in foreign clubs such as FC Twente, Panathinaikos and Novara. He mainly plays as winger.

Club career

Anorthosis Famagusta
On 27 August 2020, Paroutis signed with Cypriot First Division club Anorthosis Famagusta.
Paroutis made his debut for Anorthosis in a cup match against Karmiotissa and he scored.

Loan to Ermis Aradippou
On 2 September 2021, Paroutis joined Ermis on loan until the end of the season. He played for Ermis 28 games and scored 9 goals.

Career statistics

References

2001 births
Living people
Cypriot footballers
Cyprus youth international footballers
Association football midfielders
Anorthosis Famagusta F.C. players
Ermis Aradippou FC players
People from Limassol